RadioKing is a French radio hosting company that provides services for the creation and development of Internet radio stations. RadioKing currently hosts more than 3,000 radio stations in over 170 countries, created by both hobbyists and professional broadcasters. Their main service, radio hosting, allows users to create an online radio. This service is also open to FM stations who wish to stream their broadcast to the internet. Other than radio hosting, RadioKing also offers services such as: the creation of radio websites, radio mobile apps and vocal apps in order to help radio stations amplify their digital presence.

History 
RadioKing was founded by Maxime Piquette and Charles de Potter in February 2013.

Services and features

Radio Streaming 
RadioKing has created a tool named “The Radio Manager” which allows anyone (individuals, businesses, organizations, schools, FM/AM stations...) to create and manage a radio station. With the Radio Manager, users can upload their MP3 files, create playlists & programs and schedule their content to broadcast on a certain day, at a certain time. Users can also broadcast live at any time. All radio stations hosted by RadioKing broadcast worldwide, 24/7.
Users who wish to test the service can benefit from a free 14 day trial. RadioKing provides many features to help radio enthusiasts around the world such as:

 24/7 automatic broadcasting
 Live broadcasting via any IceCast compatible software
 Customizable radio player
 Dedicated radio page
 Storage and Hosting for Content Files
 Sound quality up to 320kbit/s
 Detailed Station Statistics
 Various widgets: broadcast tracks, broadcast artists, top tracks, current track, smartlink
 Geo-protection
 Team (add team members to help manage your radio station)
 Weekly audience report

Radio Mobile App 
RadioKing allows subscribers to create their own mobile app for their radio station. Compatible with iPhones and androids, the app allows listeners to tune into the publisher's radio station through many platforms such as the google play store, apple store, Appletv, Androidtv, Android Auto (proving direct access from cars that contain android auto), and the Apple Watch.

The RadioKing mobile app is designed specifically for web radio stations and FM radio stations.

Subscribers can add as much content as they want to their radio station's mobile app while updating their listeners when new content is released.

Google's Admod advertising platform is directly integrated into the mobile application allowing subscribers to monetize their radio station. RadioKing's mobile app creation service also provides free integration to the Flurry platform, providing detailed analytics about downloads and the use of your radio app.

There are three subscription plans: starter, pro and business. Starter, priced at $348 a year or $35 a month, provides a native mobile app for android phones & includes 5000 push notifications. Pro, priced at $540 a year or $52 a month, provides access to android phones, Androidtv, android auto & includes 50,000 push notifications. Business, priced at $708 a year or $70 a month, provides access to android phones, iPhones, Appletv, Androidtv, Android auto, Applewatch & includes 100,000 push notifications. The starter plan has an optional white labeling feature for an additional $10 a month while this feature is included for free in both the pro and business subscription plans.

Radio Website 
RadioKing provides a service allowing subscribers to create their own radio-based website for their radio station. The website integrates a play bar that is visible on all pages, allowing listeners to navigates throughout the website without any interruption in their listening experience.

RadioKing's website building service allows easy customization providing responsive websites that perfectly adapt to each screen. This radio website CMS service also provides seamless uploading and organization of content.

Subscribers can interact with website listeners through games, contests, comments, a native voting system, and a chat feature. Subscribers can also manage their listening community by creating a members area, defining access rights of each user and giving team members webmaster roles. Google analytics can be easily integrated to give subscribers a clear view of web statistics and data. This service also includes advanced SEO tools that takes your indexing a step further, allowing you to easily adjust page titles, set keywords, and edit meta descriptions.

Vocal Applications 
RadioKing's Vocal Application service allows online radios to create their own voice apps for Amazon Alexa and Google Assistant connected devices. These vocal applications allow listeners to launch a radio station by voice command, they can also ask their connected speaker to inform them of the title & artist that is currently playing. Access to these vocal applications costs $119 per year.

Listening Platforms 
As one of the largest radio hosting providers, RadioKing provides subscribers the ability to create and host their own radio station through its native broadcasting platform.

RadioKing provides its own web-based listening platform.

RadioKing released their mobile listening app on February 1, 2021. The app, compatible with both android and iOS devices, is available for free on the apple and google play store.

Company Milestones 

 Feb 2013: Creation of RadioKing
 July 2014: New version of the Radio Website
 Feb 2015: Launches new radio manager
 April 2016: RadioKing enters the international market
 October 2016: New version of the Radio App
 December 2016: Releases Android TV app
 Jan 2017: Launches Android Auto App
 May 2017: Releases their new website redesign
 September 2017: Launches StudioKing
 Jan 2019: Launches Alexa Skills (Vocal Apps)
 December 2019: New Radio Website theme
 April 2020: New version of the Radio Manager
 Feb 2021: Google Home Vocal Apps
 Feb 2021: Releases New listening app
 March 2022 : Releases New version of the statistics tab
 April 2022 : Releases Smartlink

References

External links 

 RadioKing.com

Companies based in Hauts-de-France
Internet properties established in 2013